Capitol police in the United States are agencies charged with the provision of security police services for various state agencies, but especially state legislatures. Capitol police may function as part of the state police or may be an independent agency. There is also a federal capitol police agency. 

Security police for government facilities are a very old idea, dating back at least to the guards posted at Solomon's temple and including such units as the Praetorian Guard and the Coldstream Guards.

United States Capitol Police
The United States Capitol Police is the agency charged with the protection of the United States Congress and the United States Capitol Building, as well as all the other buildings used by Congress.

State capitol police agencies

Current
 Arkansas State Capitol Police
 Connecticut State Capitol Police
 Delaware Capitol Police
 Florida Capitol Police 
Georgia Capitol Police
 Illinois Capitol Police
 Indiana Capitol Police 
 Kansas Capitol Police  
 Maine Capitol Police  
 Maryland Capitol Police
 Missouri Capitol Police
 Mississippi Capitol Police
 Nevada:
 Nevada Capitol Police
 Nevada Legislative Police
 North Carolina:
 North Carolina State Capitol Police 
 North Carolina General Assembly Police
 Pennsylvania Capitol Police
 Rhode Island Capitol Police  
 Virginia Capitol Police
 West Virginia Capitol Police

Former
 Arizona State Capitol Police (defunct as of 2011; merged with the Arizona Department of Public Safety)
 California State Police (merged with the California Highway Patrol)
 Iowa Capitol Police (defunct as of 2000; merged with the Iowa State Patrol)
 Massachusetts Capitol Police (merged with Massachusetts State Police in 1992)
 Texas Capitol Police (merged with Texas Department of Public safety)

See also
 Public safety department

In other countries 
 Republican Guard (France)
 German Parliament Police
 Ontario Legislative Security Service
 Parliamentary Protective Service, Canada
 Eishi (Serjeant-at-arms), Japan

Law enforcement in the United States
Specialist law enforcement agencies
Legislatures
State capitols in the United States